Watson Lake Airport  is located  west of Watson Lake, Yukon, Canada, and is operated by the Yukon government.

Historical airline service

Commencing in the early 1940s, scheduled passenger service was operated in the past by Canadian Pacific Air Lines and its successors CP Air and Canadian Airlines International to Vancouver, British Columbia; Edmonton, Alberta; Whitehorse, Yukon; Fort Nelson, British Columbia; Fort St. John, British Columbia and Prince George, British Columbia. CP Air served the airport with Boeing 737-200 jetliners during the 1970s with direct, no change of plane flights to all of the above destinations; however, this jet service ended as a result of deregulation.  Other Canadian Pacific flights into the airport over the years were operated with such twin engine prop aircraft as the Lockheed Lodestar, the Douglas DC-3 and the Convair 240 as well as with the larger, four engine Douglas DC-6B propliner and the Bristol Britannia turboprop.

Passenger service was also provided in the mid 1990s by several regional and commuter airlines such as Central Mountain Air flying Beechcraft twin turboprop aircraft and Alkan Air operating Piper Navajo aircraft.

As of September 12, 2016, Alkan Air resumed thrice-weekly scheduled service between Watson Lake and Whitehorse. The service ended at the end of September 2018.

Airlines and destinations

See also

Watson Lake Water Aerodrome

References

External links
Yukon Government Airports/Aerodromes

Certified airports in Yukon
Airfields of the United States Army Air Forces Air Transport Command in Alaska
Airfields of the United States Army Air Forces in Canada